Nadine Lüchinger (born September 16, 1978) is a Swiss film producer based in Zurich. She has been nominated for her film Ala Kachuu – Take and Run for the Best Live Action Short Film at the 94th Academy Awards.

Life and career 
In 2010, Nadine graduated in Cultural Anthropology, Economics and Political Sciences at the University of Zurich with a focus on Visual Anthropology.  During her field research in Argentina, she produced, directed and cut the documentary Life in Bubbles, which was shown at international festivals and won two awards. She then began to work at various renowned Swiss production companies, like Maximage. In 2014, she became a producer at Filmgerberei responsible for establishing the fiction and doc department. Since then, Nadine has produced several short and medium-length films that are internationally shown and award-winning.

Filmography 
As Producer

 Doug & Walter by Samuel Morris (2016)
 Puppenspiel by Ares Ceylan (2016)
 The witcher by Maja Tschumi (2017)
 Regimes by Maja Tschumi (2019)
 Metta da fein by Urs Berlinger & Carlo Beer (2020)
 Ala Kachuu – Take and Run by Maria Brendle (2020)
 Everything about Martin Suter. Everything but the truth by André Schäfer (2022)

As Director

 Life in Bubbles (2008)

Accolade(s)

Notes

External links 

 

Living people
1978 births
Swiss film directors
Swiss film producers
Swiss women film producers
Swiss women film directors